Roy Branch (born July 12, 1953) is a former professional baseball pitcher who played one season for the Seattle Mariners of Major League Baseball (MLB) in .

Branch was drafted in the 1st round (5th overall) of the 1971 Major League Baseball Draft by the Kansas City Royals. His contract was purchased from the Royals by the Mariners on January 23, .

External links

1953 births
Living people
African-American baseball players
American expatriate baseball players in Mexico
Baseball players from St. Louis
Billings Mustangs players
Daytona Beach Islanders players
Dorados de Chihuahua players
Jacksonville Suns players
Kingsport Royals players
Major League Baseball pitchers
Mexican League baseball pitchers
Navegantes del Magallanes players
American expatriate baseball players in Venezuela
Orlando Juice players
San Jose Bees players
San Jose Missions players
Seattle Mariners players
Southern Illinois Salukis baseball players
Spokane Indians players
Tecolotes de Nuevo Laredo players
Waterloo Royals players
21st-century African-American people
20th-century African-American sportspeople